The Malaysia FA Cup is an annual national knock-out football tournament in Malaysia. The competition was first held in 1990. It was previously managed by the Football Association of Malaysia, before being transferred to the Football Malaysia LLP (now known as Malaysian Football League) in the 2016 season.

As of 2023, the cup is contested among the clubs from the Malaysia Super League and Malaysia M3 League.

The winners of the competition are awarded with a slot to compete in the AFC Cup. The current title holders are Johor Darul Ta'zim, which won their second title in the 2022 edition.

History 
The tournament was introduced during the Liga Semi-Pro era in 1990. The first winner of the competition was Perak who beat Selangor 4–2 in the final at Merdeka Stadium, Kuala Lumpur.

In 2016, FMLLP has taken over the management of the competition from Football Association of Malaysia (FAM). For the 2016 season, there were 32 teams competing in the tournament, with 12 teams each from the Malaysia Super League and Malaysia Premier League, while the other 8 teams were decided with a play-off within Malaysia FAM League teams.

In the 2019 season there were 59 clubs competing in the tournament, with 12 clubs from the Malaysia Super League, nine clubs from the Malaysia Premier League, 14 clubs from Liga M3 and 24 clubs from Liga M4.

Logo evolution 
Since the inception of the competition in 1990, numerous logo has been introduced for the cup to reflect the sponsorship purpose. Dunhill was the title sponsor for the competition until the agreement was ended at the end of the 2004 season as tobacco advertising was banned in the country. From 2005 to 2010, the Piala FA incorporated the TM brand as part of its logo as the title sponsor. After the end of TM sponsorship for seven consecutive years, FAM has been partnering with Astro Media as a strategic partner for the Malaysian League starting from the 2011 season. 

In 2012, FAM introduced a new logo which has been used from 2012 until the end of the 2015 season. For the 2016 season a new logo was introduced as part of the takeover of the league by FMLLP. Superbest Power has become the title sponsor of the tournament for the 2016 season. For the 2017 season, FMLLP introduced a new logo without the title sponsor. In July 2018, FMLLP introduced a new logo with Shopee as the title sponsor for the 2018 season.

Sponsorship

Qualification for subsequent competitions

Asian football
The Malaysia FA Cup winners qualify for the following season's AFC Champions League or AFC Cup. This Asian place applies even if the team is relegated or is not in the Malaysia top flight but the team must qualify for the AFC's club licensing rules and regulations. Previously, if the FA Cup winners also qualified for the following season's Champions League or AFC Cup through their league or Asian performance, then the runner-up of the Malaysia Super League were given the Asian slot.

In 2020, the tournament was declared 'null and void' due to COVID-19 pandemic and the Asian qualification (as the cup winner) for the AFC Champions League or AFC Cup will moved to 2020 Malaysia Cup.

Finals

Performance by clubs

See also 
Malaysia Cup

References 

 
National association football cups
Football cup competitions in Malaysia